Johan Ekman (10 October 1854 – 30 December 1922) was a Swedish sports shooter. He competed in four events at the 1912 Summer Olympics.

References

1854 births
1922 deaths
Swedish male sport shooters
Olympic shooters of Sweden
Shooters at the 1912 Summer Olympics
Sportspeople from Uppsala